The Hydromatics is an American garage rock supergroup formed by Nick Royale, Scott Morgan and Tony Slug as side project to their main bands.

History
The Hydromatics was formed Nick Royale from The Hellacopters and Tony Slug from Amsterdam punk band The Nitwitz planned to record a series of Sonic's Rendezvous Band coversongs, but the project was long on hold due to the hectic touring schedules of The Hellacopters. However Tony Slug was able to get a hold of Sonic's Rendezvous Band founder Scott Morgan and during the Hellacopters second visit to Detroit Morgan happily accepted the offer to record with Tony and Nick. In 1999 Scott and Nick flew to Amsterdam and met up with Tony and his bandmate Theo Brouwer and The Hydromatics were born. 

The band rehearsed for six days, played three shows in Amsterdam and wrote some new material for the band's debut album "Parts Unknown." After a six-week tour through Europe, which resulted in the six-track live CD "Fluid Drive," Nick decided to leave the band due to his commitments to The Hellacopters and was replaced by Andy Frost. In 2001 the band released their second album, "Powerglide," containing seven Sonic's Rendezvous Band covers and seven new tracks. Soon after, bassist Theo left and moved to Spain and Laurent Ciron was called in as his replacement. After the tour the band took an extended hiatus while the members concentrated on various other bands. Scott and Nicke teamed up once again and formed the soul band The Solution. After the hiatus the band returned with Kent Steedman (formerly of Australian band The Celibate Rifles) on guitar and Ries Doms on drums.

Line up

Current members
Scott Morgan - lead vocals, guitar, harmonica
Tony Slug - guitar
Ries Doms - drums
Theo Brouwer - bass guitar
Kent Steedman - guitar

Former members
Nicke Andersson - drums, percussion, backing vocals
Laurent Ciron - bass guitar
Andy Frost - drums

Discography
Dangerous / Heaven 45 (RocketDog, Holland, lim. 1000 copies)
Parts Unknown LP/CD (White Jazz, Sweden, 1999)
Powerglide CD (Freakshow, Italy, 2001)
Powerglide LP (Cargo, Germany)
R.I.P. rnr on Ox fanzine compilation (Germany)
Soulbone on Live at The Subsonic, Vol. 1 (Speed, France)
R.I.P. rnr and "Do It Again" on Death Rattle and Roll (Wondertaker, USA)
Live 10 (Pitshark , France, lim. 500 copies)
The Earth Is Shaking (Suburban, NL, 2007)

External links
The Hydromatics MySpace
Hydromatics History
Pitshark Records, released the LIVE 10"

Musical groups from Detroit
Dutch punk rock groups
Swedish punk rock groups
Punk rock groups from Michigan
Musical groups established in 1999